is a Japanese manga written and illustrated by Jun Fukami.

The manga was published in Kodansha's semimonthly  manga magazine Be Love from 1988 to 1997. In 1991 manga has win 15th Kodansha Manga Award in general category. Manga was collected in thirty-seven tankōbon volumes. The first volume was released on July 13, 1989 and last on July 11, 1997.

In 1992, manga was adapted into television drama.

Story

Characters

Media

Manga
The manga was published in Kodansha's semimonthly manga magazine Be Love from 1988 to 1997. In 1991 manga has win 15th Kodansha Manga Award in general category. Manga consisting 222 chapters was collected and published in thirty-seven tankōbon volumes. The first volume was released on July 13, 1989 and last on July 11, 1997.

Drama

References

External links

1988 manga
Josei manga
Japanese television dramas based on manga
Kodansha manga
Winner of Kodansha Manga Award (General)
Yomiuri Telecasting Corporation original programming